ITM may stand for:

Education
 ITM Global School, an English medium co-educational day school in Gwalior, Madhya Pradesh, India
 ITM Law School, one of the professional graduate schools of ITM University
 ITM-IFM, Mumbai, India
 Institut Teknologi Mara, a public university in Shah Alam, Selangor, Malaysia
 Institute for Information, Telecommunication and Media Law, educational organization in Münster, Germany
 Institute of Tropical Medicine Antwerp, research and training in tropical medicine, Belgium
 Information technology management
 International Tourism Management

Music
 In This Moment, a female-led metalcore band
 Irish traditional music
 In the Meantime (Alessia Cara album)

Other
 Independent Timber Merchants, a New Zealand building supplies and hardware retailer
 ITM Cup, a rugby union professional competition for New Zealand unions
 ITM Power, manufactures integrated hydrogen energy solutions
 ITM Stadium, in Whangarei, New Zealand
 Indiana Transportation Museum, a railroad museum
 Intermediate-term memory, a stage of memory
 International Trade Mart
 International Tourism Mart, an international tourism event in India
 Irish Transverse Mercator, new geographic coordinate system of Ireland
 Israeli Transverse Mercator, new geographic coordinate system of Israel
 IATA Airport Code of Osaka International Airport, Japan

See also
 ITM University (disambiguation)
 In the Morning (disambiguation)